Kern Cupid (born November 4, 1984) is a professional football defender from Trinidad and Tobago. He currently plays for W Connection in the TT Pro League. He is also a member of the Trinidad and Tobago national football team making his international debut against El Salvador in October 2007 in a friendly match.

External links
 
 Kern Cupid Profile at the Socawarriors.net website.

1984 births
Living people
Trinidad and Tobago international footballers
Trinidad and Tobago footballers
W Connection F.C. players
TT Pro League players
Association football defenders